Season one of the reality competition series Cambodia's Got Talent and started on 30 November 2014 and finished on 5 March 2015, it was host by Nhem Sokun and Per Chamrong and on the judging panel was Preap Sovath, Khat Sokhim and Neavy Koy. the golden buzzer was including in this series as it's been introduce in many other got talent shows in the Got Talent series as the act who revises the golden buzzer will be sent straight through to the live shows it can be only used by each judge only once. The season was won by 15-year-old blind singer Yoeun Pisey.

Live Shows
The live shows began on 2 January 2015.

The judges can use their buzzers if they dislike an act. If three buzzers are used the act will be over but can still be voted.

Live Shows Week 1 (January 2, 2015)

Live Shows Week 2 (January 11, 2015)

Live Shows Week 3 (January 16, 2015)

Live Shows Week 4 (January 23, 2015)

Live Shows Week 5 (January 30, 2015)

Live Shows Week 6 (February 6, 2015)

Finale

Got Talent
2014 Cambodian television seasons
2015 Cambodian television seasons